Wisconsin Highway 189 (WIS 189) was a short state highway in Wisconsin. It traveled from WIS 36/WIS 83 in Rochester to WIS 20.

Route description
Starting at its western terminus, WIS 189 traveled eastward from WIS 36/WIS 83. Continuing east, it shortly ended at WIS 20 east of Rochester.

History
In 1947, WIS 189 was formed as a result of WIS 20 being diverted and extended west. It traveled between WIS 36/WIS 83 and WIS 20 at a short distance. During its existence, no significant changes were made. By 1969, the route became decommissioned. Today, the former route is now part of CTH-D.

Major intersections

Reference

189
Transportation in Racine County, Wisconsin